Patric Della Rossa (born 28 July 1975 in Winterthur, Switzerland) is a Swiss ice hockey player who currently plays for EHC Olten of the National League B (NLB).  He has also represented the Switzerland men's national ice hockey team in the World Junior Championships, World Championships, and Olympics.

Career statistics

Regular season and playoffs

International

External links

1975 births
Living people
EHC Basel players
Ice hockey players at the 2002 Winter Olympics
Ice hockey players at the 2006 Winter Olympics
Olympic ice hockey players of Switzerland
People from Winterthur
Swiss ice hockey forwards
ZSC Lions players
Sportspeople from the canton of Zürich